Nicolás Caro (born 4 May 1995) is an Argentine professional footballer who plays as a centre-back for Deportivo Riestra.

References

External links
 

Living people
1995 births
Association football defenders
Argentine footballers
Argentine expatriate footballers
Estudiantes de Buenos Aires footballers
Cerro Porteño players
Club Atlético Lanús footballers
Club Atlético Brown footballers
Gimnasia y Esgrima de Jujuy footballers
Club Atlético Atlanta footballers
Deportivo Riestra players
Primera B Metropolitana players
Primera Nacional players
Argentine expatriate sportspeople in Paraguay
Expatriate footballers in Paraguay
Sportspeople from Buenos Aires Province